Thomas Davey (1758 – 2 May 1823) was a New South Wales Marine and member of the First Fleet to New South Wales, who went on to become the second Lieutenant Governor of Van Diemen's Land.

Early life
Davey was born in England in 1758, the son of a mill owner. There are no records of his childhood or early youth. In 1775 Great Britain declared war on her American colonies; three years later Davey decided to enter the military with a view to serving overseas. Strenuous lobbying by Davey's father secured political patronage for a commission as second lieutenant in His Majesty's Marine Forces, and Davey was posted aboard  in this capacity in 1779. In the following year he transferred to the 50-gun frigate  and took part in attacks on French forces in the West Indies. He was promoted to first lieutenant in mid-1780 but fell ill shortly afterward and was invalided back to England. He did not return to active service until 1786.

He left Sydney at the end of 1792, at the time of the mutiny at the Nore was a captain of marines, and fought at the Battle of Trafalgar in 1805. In September 1811 (he was then a major of marines), through the influence of Lord Harrowby, he was appointed lieutenant-governor of Tasmania in June 1812. It is said that he left England without informing his wife, but she got wind of his departure and, rushing, managed to get aboard. Upon being informed of her arrival Davey lost his temper and hurled his wig at the wall. He arrived in Sydney on 25 October 1812 and reported to Governor Lachlan Macquarie, whose orders he had been instructed to observe. He remained in Sydney for nearly four months, and did not land at Hobart until 20 February 1813. All his possessions were lost en route and Davey put in a claim of substantial length.

Van Diemen's Land

Davey appears to have had no qualifications for his position. He was indolent and without sense of dignity, and indulged fully in the hard-drinking that was a characteristic of the period. He is still remembered for his invention of the "Blow My Skull" punch, the recipe for which is found in Edward Abbott's The English and Australian Cookery Book.

Macquarie had received a private letter from the authorities warning him to keep a close watch on Davey, and on 30 April 1814 reported that his conduct was pretty correct, "except for making locations of land to persons not entitled", he had every reason to believe that he "is honest and means well" but that his character made him a "very unfit man for so important a station". Nearly a year later Macquarie again reported very adversely, and in April 1816 Earl Bathurst in a dispatch to Macquarie recalled Davey, but suggested that he should be allowed to resign, and that a grant of land should be made to him.

Davey was confronted by one of the largest, most daring and successful bushranging gangs of Australian history, that of Michael Howe. Davey was checked and humiliated time and time again by Howe's exploits. Signing himself as "The Governor of the Rangers" in letters to Davey, Howe threatened to set the colony on fire from end to end and Davey feared that there would be a general uprising of the convicts.

Davey handed over his position to Governor William Sorell on 9 April 1817. Considerable grants of land were made to him, but he was not successful with them and he sailed to England from Sydney in August 1821, leaving his wife and daughter in Tasmania. He died on 2 May 1823.

Legacy
Davey was of a weakly, amiable nature, but much progress was made during his administration, including the designation of Hobart as a free port. As lieutenant governor he had encouraged humane treatment of aborigines, and strong action against bushranging. His limited official powers had a consequential and negative effect in his subsequent reputation, as did his poor choices of subordinate officials.

His service is commemorated in the name of Port Davey in Tasmania, an inlet on the south west coast of Tasmania. Davey Street in Hobart is named in his honour.
Richard Davey was a descendant.

See also
 Governor Davey's Proclamation

References

Bibliography

Further reading

 
 Robson, L. L. (1983). A History of Tasmania. Volume I. Van Diemen's Land From the Earliest Times to 1855. Melbourne: Oxford University Press. .

1758 births
1823 deaths
Governors of Tasmania
Royal Marines officers
Royal Navy personnel of the Napoleonic Wars
Australian penal colony administrators
19th-century Australian public servants
First Fleet